The Wŏlmido Sports Club is a North Korean football club affiliated with the Ministry of Culture and Fine Arts of North Korea, based in Kimchaek; their home ground is Kimchaek Municipal Stadium, which has a capacity of 30,000. The men's team plays in the DPR Korea Premier Football League, whilst the women's team plays in the DPR Korea Women's League.

The club is named after Wŏlmido Island near Inch'ŏn.

History

Players

Squad

Managers
 Kim Tong-il

Achievements
Hwaebul Cup: 1
SF 2015

Poch'ŏnbo Torch Prize: 1
SF 2015

References

 
Football clubs in North Korea
North Hamgyong